Sternotomis gama is a species of beetle in the family Cerambycidae. It was described by Charles Coquerel in 1861. It has a wide distribution in Africa.

References

Sternotomini
Beetles described in 1861
Taxa named by Charles Coquerel